Best Night of Our Lives is Everyday Sunday's fifth full-length album, which was released June 16, 2009.

Track listing

Personnel 

 Breezy Baldwin — design, photography, packaging
 Dale Bray — executive producer
 Nathan Dantzler — mastering
 Rob Roy Fingerhead — guitar, piano, keyboards
 Nick Spencer — guitars
 Adam Hull — assistant
 J.R. McNeely — mixing
 Trey Pearson — vocals

Chart positions

References 

2009 albums
Everyday Sunday albums